This glossary of French criminal law is a list of explanations or translations of contemporary and historical concepts of criminal law in France.

Introduction

Scope 

This glossary includes terms from criminal law under the legal system in France. Legal terms from other countries that use French language (Belgium, Canada, Switzerland, North Africa, etc.) are not included here. Terms from the French civil code (known as the Napoleonic code) and from French administrative law are generally not included, unless they have repercussions for criminal law.

Disclaimer 

There is absolutely no assurance that any statement contained in this article is true, correct, or precise. The information in this article is, at best, of a general nature and cannot substitute for the advice of a competent authority with specialized knowledge.

Style 

Each entry consists of a bolded headword containing one French expression, followed by an indented section with a  translated equivalent or description of the term. Headwords appear as they would be if found in English running text; thus italicized, and in lower case unless always capitalized. Many of these terms can be found in French Wikipedia. Below the headword, the indented text may contain either a direct translation of the French term, a definition or description of it, or some combination. A section symbol (§) prefixed before a term indicates  another term appearing on the page. Headwords are alphabetized as if they contained no embedded blanks; accented letters are alphabetized as if they were not accented; for example:  comes after  but before .

Glossary

A 

 repeal of an Act; revocation (of regulations, etc.)

 misuse; fraudulent misuse See also: .
 Usage notes:
  ⟶ abuse (misuse) of official authority.
  ⟶ misuse of a company's property or credit
  ⟶ misappropriation, embezzlement; fraudulent conversion. In other contexts (civil law) ⟶ breach of trust.
  ⟶ child sexual abuse
  : see also disability abuse.
  ⟶ abuse of power – exercise of a legal right only to cause annoyance, harm, or injury.
 Other contexts (outside of criminal law): 
  ⟶ (in civil law) abuse of rights
  (in commercial law) see Law 420-2..

 adversarial

Compare .

See .

 inhumane act See . any document having legal significance; an instrument
 a term which has no equivalent in English, but means any document or action which has legal implications (contrast ).
 Usage note:  ⟶ to institute criminal proceedings

 prison service

 case

 criminal case See . law enforcement officer; police officer; police.

 act under the influence of
 Usage note:  ⟶ an eggcorn with the same meaning

 criminal conduct

 

 paragraph

 public confession, apology set aside, declare void; cancel, repeal, nullify. See also .
 Usage note:
  ⟶ set aside a judgment or ruling
   ⟶ action to set aside

 life; for life an appeal. See also: , . 
 Usage notes: 
  ⟶ frivolous or vexatious appeal
   ⟶ when an appeal is made to the Court of Appeal, the term "" is used concerns the legal effects of a law which replaces or amends an older one on the same topic, and the extent to which it applies to situations which arose before it came into force. The old law nevertheless continues to have certain effects.

 weapon

 arrest a judgment (of a court). a judgment referring a case back to another court. to summon. 
 Usage notes:
  or ...  ⟶ to summon  [someone] to appear before the court
  ⟶ to restrict [someone] to a residence

 conspiracy (or, when referring to the s, co-conspirators) a punitive measure by which a court obliges a guilty person to pay a certain sum of money per day of delay if he does not carry out a prior court order to give or to do something
 See also: .

 fixed term

 attack

 whereas

 (court) hearing

 principal offender, defendant

 see  principal offender.  See also .

See also .

 legitimate authority

 to alert the legal authorities

 B  organized gang banishment. A type of  punishment under the Ancien régime. See . money laundering; also, whitewashing, and in non-legal context: bleaching the constitutional block is a set of texts recognized as being invested with the same constitutional force as the French Constitution itself. It includes the Declaration of the Rights of Man and of the Citizen (1789), the preamble of the Constitution of 1946,  and the Charter for the Environment (2004).See also . reasonable person; a bonus pater familias, reasonable man state executioner See  (PSE),  (PSEM).

 C  legal competence. The ability to have rights and obligations and to exercise them oneself. Minors do not have it, neither do adults under guardianship or curatorship.

See . criminal record. See also . grounds for which a judge might declare a defendant not morally responsible (cf. ) for a crime, even if they are materially responsible (cf. ) for it. It is up to legislators to decide, generally speaking, what acts are to be considered criminal, and it is up to the judges to decide in individual cases whether a defendant is criminally responsible for an act.

 to supply. See . A prison or institutional housing for those inmates with the best prospects for reintegration into society. Their detention is mainly oriented towards the resocialization of prisoners.

 a supply of drugs. From the verb .

 Usage note: in larger jurisdictions, numbered to distinguish one from another, as in, le ne chambre correctionalle ⟶ "the nth criminal division"  

Example:  (summons to appear). Called an  under the old system. The  Court of Justice of the European Union (CJEU). The decisioncan be taken for legal reasons or on the elements of the investigation: unidentified perpetrator, absence or insufficient evidence, withdrawal of complaint. See also: .

 a joint principal; based on the idea of a joint endeavor, in which two or more people involved in an act are equally liable for everything that happens, regardless whether they were present or not. The mens rea formed by one is imputed to the others. (CPP)
 . The legal code which covers all aspects of French criminal procedure French criminal code; also called the "penal code".

Similar to Letters rogatory. The  can delegate investigative acts to the police via a  Appearance; the act of appearing in court. See also . (CRPC) French justice does not have a guilty plea or plea bargaining as in common law, but the CRPC allows the prosecutor to offer a reduced sentence of up to one year in prison or half of the maximum penalty if the defendant admits the offense. Introduced in 2004 and later extended to almost all , by 2012 it was 13% of  prosecutions. See also . accomplice;

A sentence that the cocnvicted person is excused from having to serve, unless found guilty for some other offense within five years. A conviction becomes final when all recourses have been exhausted (e.g., appeal). It cannot be challenged unless the trial is reviewed.

This is not part of criminal law, which is under the .Consent

 commission (in non-legal contexts: consumption, intake, use of)

A non-criminal offense (such as a parking ticket) is a minor offense judged by the police court. The offender is liable to a fine and/or a penalty that deprives or restricts his rights, such as suspension of the driver's license, a ban on issuing checks,  etc. Judicial supervision.
 judicial review contempt of court

 See .

 (adj.)
 guilty

 (n.)
 guilty person. There is no guilty plea in French criminal law. A defendant may confess to a crime, but this becomes one more piece of evidence that can be used against them. Plea bargaining does not exist. See also: .

 crime of intentionally injuring another

 Court.

 court that tries serious offenses. In principle, it is situated in the chief town of the department or in the seat of the court of appeal if there is one in the department. Appeals against conviction verdicts handed down by an Assize Court are reviewed by another Assize Court composed of three professional judges and nine jurors.

 court that tries serious offenses by minors

 court that hears final appeals on points of law only. Its role is not to retry a case, but to check that court decisions have been rendered in accordance with the rules of law.

The penalty is more than 10 years imprisonment and the fine is at least 75,000 euros.

 crime against humanity

 war crime

 guilt. See .

 D 

 disqualification Loss of a right as a penalty, or because of non-compliance with conditions governing its exercise. Example: loss of civic rights following a criminal conviction. A written summary of the case, representing the resolution adopted by the court and the reasoning that led to it.

 acquittal See .

 decision to send the defendant for trial See .

 decapitation

 defendant

 to defend oneself

 wrongful conduct

 See . 
Also: . The maximum sentence is ten years, minimum is a 3750 Euro fine. Alternative sentences include community service, a citizenship course, or additional penalties.
 Usage note: in informal language, may mean any offense.

 a major offense which only requires as a mens rea that the defendant's conduct be voluntary legal claim; court petition; plaintiff's claim. miscarriage of justice; refusal of a jurisdiction to judge a case. Contrast: . Literally: to denounce. Compare: .

 See .

 deportation law enforcement officer

 Testimony given before a court, magistrate, gendarme or police officer.
 Usage note:   ⟶ to give evidence in court detention remand in custody. 
The  (pre-trial detention) must be strictly substantiated according to the conditions provided by law. A person incarcerated in a penitentiary by court order. misappropriation; the act of dispossessing someone of something of value which was entrusted to them in confidence. Can be a civil or professional offense, or a criminal offense. See also: . Some subtopics:
  (CP 432-15)
 , a confidence scheme involving fraudulent appropriation of funds
 , removing a minor from the adults having authority over them; kidnapping (CP 227-7)
 , removal of a security or collateral intended for a creditor (CP 314-5)
  moving (hiding) an object for which confiscation has been ordered (CP 314-6)
 , when a public official goes beyond their remit, in order to achieve a goal not within the authority of their position. (such acts are nullified, and not a criminal offense) See .
 , when a public official uses a technique envisioned by law for one specific purpose, for a different one, in order to get around some judicial obstacle and attain some other goal. (a civil, not a criminal offense) embezzlement.
 Usage note:   ⟶ to misappropriate;  ⟶ misappropriation

 care

 court's finding (stated at the end of the decision)
 fault;  
 a fraudulent scheme to deceive another person in order to obtain their consent Compare confidence game. 
 additional mens rea beyond  or  special intention;  
 the repercussions of the act go beyond the intention of, or the foreseeable outcome by the defendant oblique or indirect intention; See also . Deliberate commission of a criminal act, while having foreknowledge that the act is prohibited by law and has criminal sanctions. 
 See . 
 where a person acts intending a certain result, but without being able to foresee the actual outcome criminal intent.
 right (as in, the right to do something; human rights): the prerogatives attributed to an individual. 
Contrast: . All the rules concerning the organization and operation of the State, local authorities, and administration, as well as their relations with private persons. Contrast: .

 E  A  (written legal act) that a person has been turned over to a prison warden for detention, including the name of the inmate, the date, and the reasons for incarceration. An act of committal; a legal document drawn up for any person who is taken to a penitentiary establishment or who presents himself there voluntarily.
 In other contexts: a hardware nut.

  
 breaking (of a lock, door, fence, or other barrier to an enclosed area)
 Usage notes:  
  ⟶ entrance by force break-in
  ⟶ to break in
  ⟶ breaking and entering
   ⟶ burglary equality before the law. Another name for  the actus reus of an offense (lit.: material element). This is the visible, external part of the offense, i.e., the actions involved in carrying out a criminal act. Contrast: . the mens rea of an offense (lit.: 'guilty mind'); i.e., the psychological attitude of the perpetrator towards the commission of the acts deemed to be punishable by criminal law. The perpetrator may have acted with intent, or through recklessness or negligence. Contrast: . Another name for  information; criteria; background info; key aspects; indications; evidence; considerations. evidence See also: . The genetic characteristics permitting an individual to be identified. See also: . life imprisonment. See . 
 incur a punishment 
 to break the law abduction; kidnapping for major offenses; in cases involving major offenses expedited investigation (with extended powers) of recently committed offenses (within 16 days). Compare .
 the police investigation implemented in cases of flagrance, i.e. a restrictive definition of flagrante delicto. Compare .
 an investigation by the judicial police police investigation impede (ERIS)
 Special forces of the prison administration system who intervene in case of serious tensions at a prison. It is composed of about forty specially trained and equipped surveillance personnel who attempt to prevent incidents from escalating, participate in general searches and restore order if necessary.  See . error of judgment;   ⟶ manifest error of judgment  
 error of law fraud cropping; removal of a person's ears as a physical punishment. See , .  rule of law (lit. Although there is debate about the point, there is a general consensus that  and rule of law are equivalent. to be subjected to conditional bail to be classed as a weapon to be subjected to conditional bail to be prosecuted to be punished with to be found guilty  to bring a prosecution; see .

 F  criminal conduct See . established fault the mens rea of minor offenses carelessness False testimony. Perjury is a very serious offense, since it undermines not only one of the parties to trial, but also the moral authority of justice. If it is committed for money, it is considered to be  corruption. imprisoned; [condemned to] forced labor;  literally: "irons".
 Usage notes: , ; .
See . A crime in progress, or having just been committed; in flagrante delicto. See also .   
 branding. A type of corporal punishment under the Ancien régime.{{sfn|Doucet|2019|loc=[http://ledroitcriminel.fr/dictionnaire/lettre_m/lettre_m_maq.htm See . The  is a national system for managing the data about genetic traces of  those convicted of certain crimes (rape, murder, drug-dealing) as well as those suspected of those crimes with strong evidence, in order to facilitate the identification and apprehension of perpetrators. See . refers to the issues of fact in a case upon which the judge rules. See also:  that which can be enforced, if necessary, by the public force (Example: a judgment). Certain ordinances, notably administrative or notarial, can also be enforceable. An unforeseen, insurmountable event beyond a person's control that may relieve someone of legal responsibility for certain acts.
See also . Loss of a right which was not exercised within the prescribed time limit. Example: expiration of the time allowed to appeal a case. See . A boilerplate text serving as a model which can be used to draft legal documents of the same type. This enforceable copy is called the "". search
 Usage notes: 
 , or  : body search, personal search. 
 : baggage search
  : to frisk
 in other contexts (plural only): : excavations, archaeological dig to impose a punishment on someone with guilty intent. See also . escape

 G  A sentence of travail forcé (forced labor) as a galley slave, as a type of punishment under the Ancien régime. See . (GAV) arrest; police custody during a police investigation. Normally, the detention lasts a maximum 24 hours; covered in  article 62-2. Formerly,  applied to witnesses as well.
The Keeper of the Seals is a title held by the Minister of Justice. The Minister guards the Great Seal of France in their office. The Seal was used in 1958 to seal the Constitution of France. See also: . National Gendarmerie. Compare National Police. practicing lawyers; the legal community official roll (of ). Literally: "large table". Registrar services of a court staffed by court officers who help the magistrates. The registry is directed by the chief registrar.
 Usage: : registrar fee (e.g., for copies); : regional court registry; : to be an adjunct of;  a judicial clerk; court clerk. Auxiliary officers who perform clerical duties, draw up documents, and ensure their authenticity and safekeeping. All informational acts by a  must be performed with the assistance of his clerk. The name derives from the fact that it in earlier times, the person delivering it was paid by the page, so it was to their advantage to write it in large letters to increase the number of pages and thus earn a higher fee.

 H  highest of three levels of  under the Ancien régime  ⟶ at any stage of the proceedings legal hours; hours in which process may be served (7 a.m. – 9 p.m.) and judgments executed homicide  voluntary homicide involuntary homicide; voluntary manslaughter bailiff, sheriff, process-server. a ministerial officer charged with writing certain documents, and implementing certain acts or judiciary decisions. Some functions are similar to that of an authorized bailiff, or an official process server authorized by the government.

 I  freezing of assets physical impossibility imprudence impunity The possibility of attributing an act to someone or something; blameworthiness, or the ability of someone to recognize their action as being unlawful.
 Usage note: defamatory allegation; innuendo see  not subject to appeal, unchallengeable incapacity, disability, disqualification
 of a private person: someone deprived—by law or by court order—of the enjoyment or exercise of certain rights. This is the case for minors or protected adults.
 Usage notes:
 incapacité d'ester en justice ⟶ lack of standing before the court
 incapacité d'exercice ⟶ incapacity to exercise one's own rights without assistance; absence of legal capacity
 :fr:incapacité permanente ⟶ permanent disability imprisonment 
arsonist arson Usage notes:
  ⟶ incitement to commit a felony
 :fr:Incitation à la haine ⟶ incitement to ethnic or racial hatred
  ⟶ subornation of perjury lack of jurisdiction. Inability of a court to hear a case for reasons relating either to the nature of the case (e.g., the  cannot try  (major crimes)), or to the nature of the person involved (e.g., the correctional court cannot try minors), or to the geographical location of one or more of the parties (e.g., the correctional court cannot try an offense committed outside its  (geographical jurisdiction) by a perpetrator who lives outside the jurisdiction)
 Usage notes:
  ⟶ finding of lack of jurisdiction
  ⟶ lack of jurisdiction  such as the defendant's place of residence 
  ⟶ refuse jurisdiction subjective misconduct, immorality Usage notes:
  ⟶ decision appealed against; decision of the court below
  ⟶ offense charged; matter being complained of
  ⟶ judgement being appealed See . accused, defendant, person charged with a criminal offense. See also: , . Informant, informer; someone who provides privileged information to law. enforcement. Also: . clues. (disgrace) is a decision, action or omission that undermines a person's reputation, taints his honor, or stains him with dishonor. Doucet I-6. Roman law, and Ancient law after it, recognized the judicial decision of infamy, which subjected the person concerned to certain social degradations. This type of sanction can work with people concerned with their honor and reputation.
See . Offense. conduct prohibited by the criminal law and punishable by a penalty specified in the law. Offenses are divided into three categories: , . . The nearest UK equivalent is a strict liability offense. criminal offense
 An offense is a behavior strictly forbidden by criminal law and sanctioned by a penalty provided for by it.
It is pronounced by a magistrate after expert medical advice and upon the agreement of the convict. The convicted person then undergoes medical treatment and monitoring by a doctor. unjustified inquisitorial See . A dispute brought before a court of law, as well as the entirety of the proceedings, from the initial petition to the judgment. In principle, in the event of an appeal, the case gives rise to new , or set of proceedings before another court. The initial petition takes place before a court of first instance, and if appealed, that would be a court of second instance. pre-trial investigation; judicial investigation; the investigative procedure in which a  gathers evidence about the commission of an offense and decides on referral to the trial court of the accused parties. The judge investigates evidence for and against the accused, i.e. he gathers all the elements in favor and against the accused.
See also: . personal conviction Impossibility for a court to study a request for justice, on the grounds that it does not respect the conditions required by law, whether they are a question of form (e.g., the time limit of the procedure not being respected) or of substance (e.g., a person claiming to be a victim does not provide proof of the alleged damage). Provisions of the law which exonerate a perpetrator from criminal responsibility for an offense and therefore exclude any conviction against him, in cases such as mental disorder, duress, self-defense, state of necessity.

 J 

 See .

 See .

 Fusion of two dossiers by a judge when they are sufficiently related, and one ruling suffices for both. day-fine (JAP)
They review the sentence, assess the offender's employment and family situation, and any efforts they have made to make amends or reparations, and may decide on a different penalty than the one received at trial. See also: . judge, court. By metonymy, it may also be used to mean courts in general. a judicial post that existed briefly between two reforms in 1993 before being abolished; was responsible for deciding whether to put someone into  (JLD)
Investigating judge. In criminal procedure, the magistrate in charge of gathering all the elements of an offense. Directs the investigation and as such gives instructions to the police and gendarmes.
 Usage notes:
  ⟶ make an informed decision. juror. 
Feudal manorial justice was a medieval mode of organization of the judicial system in most of Europe in the Middle Ages. Seigniorial courts in the kingdom of France numbered around 20,000 on the eve of the Revolution, and constituted the basis of judicial organization, along with the provosts' courts (subordinate royal courts) which were abolished in the middle of the eighteenth century. Justification. A criminal defense where the defendant claims to have done nothing wrong because the fact of committing the crime promoted some social interest or asserted a right of such importance as to outweigh any wrongfulness of the crime.
 Usage note:  – such a defense; justification; objective defense

   theft of low value A person is deemed to be acting in self-defense when they respond to an immediate and unjustified attack on their person, another person or their property, provided that the means of defense are proportional to the gravity of the attack. Similar to parole, or early release for good behavior. parole. A prisoner is paroled  when he is allowed to leave the place of detention under the sole condition of respecting certain commitments taken on honor. This term is mostly obsolete in modern France, except in some military contexts. It is similar to what is now called . a security measure taken against a juvenile offender who is placed under the supervision of an educator appointed by the juvenile judge. free will. A philosophical concept going back at least to Aristotle, and to Augustine in theological discussions about who has responsibility for evil acts. A person is said to have free will when they can, of their own volition, control their instincts and impulses, behave rationally, and act in accordance with moral and social laws. Classical criminological doctrine about guilt is based on this concept. From a legislative viewpoint, lawmakers generally presume that adults have free will, leaving it up to judges to determine how individual cases may depart from the general one. See moral responsibility, legal responsibility. causal link scene of the crime 
 Usage notes: 
  ⟶  to hasten to the scene of a crime
  ⟶ to go to the scene of the crime
	 A law. A written rule of general and impersonal scope. It applies to all without exception. An ordinary law voted on by Parliament regarding matters specifically ordained to it by the Constitution. See also:  , .  in the hierarchy of laws, this is the most important of three; a law relating to the Constitution.

Also: ; literally, the "sitting" judiciary. public prosecutors, collectively; branch of the judiciary which addresses the court on behalf of the ;. literally, 'standing judiciary'. See also: . public prosecutor's office; the prosecution. See . criminal court judge. See also: . Prison for the most difficult convicts. The detention system is essentially focused on security. A detention center that receives convicts whose sentence or remaining sentence is two years or less. ineptitude an act or warrant by which a magistrate (usually a ) orders a person to be summoned, arrested, or detained.
  – order given by a criminal court judge to any law enforcement officer to search for a person, arrest him or her and take him or her to a detention center
  – Order given by a magistrate to the head or director of a penitentiary to receive, or to keep in detention, a person under investigation. 
   – see .
  – a "search warrant" does not exist in French law; this expression is only used when talking about foreign legal systems.
Not to be confused with a "search warrant" in common law; see . judicial transfer fraudulent tactic failure to fulfill an obligation of care or of security; Literally, 'branding with a red hot iron';branding. A type of corporal punishment under the Ancien régime. See . an alternative measure to criminal proceedings. At the suggestion of the public prosecutor, it brings together the perpetrator and the victim of a criminal offense in the presence of a third party mediator authorized by the justice system. It consists of finding a freely negotiated solution and defining the terms of reparation. brief; Written document addressed to the Court of Cassation or to the administrative courts in which the parties set out their respective claims and arguments. threat When a person is dangerous, the judge may decide to apply a penal sanction of a preventive nature, such as therapeutic treatment or placement under mobile electronic surveillance. (See PSEM). murder lit. "closed environment". In a criminal justice context, "closed custody", "secure unit".
 That portion of the prison administration that deals with convicts who remain detained until their term expires. Contrast .
 In the context of medical treatment: "in-patient"; in other contexts, a  could be a ship, or a military regiment; lit. "open environment". In a criminal justice context, "open custody", "non-custodial", "open institution".
 That portion of the prison administration system that deals with penalties other than incarceration, such as community service, a citizenship course, work-release, house detention with electronic surveillance, parole, and others. Contrast: .
The Ministry of Justice is the ministry responsible for the administration of justice, and decides on reforms, and presents bills ( to Parliament. It defines criminal law policy in order to achieve equal treatment of citizens before the law, including monitoring public prosecutor's offices, manages the courts, and appoints judicial officers—bailiffs, notaries, solicitors, etc. It represents the interests of society before all courts of law.
 The Public Prosecutor's Office. The  (Public Prosecutor's Office) is hierarchical ( (public prosecutor),  (public prosecutor), deputy public prosecutor, vice-public prosecutor, and deputy public prosecutor) and subordinate to the Minister of Justice. It does not benefit from lifetime tenure. Compare indictment. The term  replaced the earlier  in 1993. set in motion; initiation; launch 
  ⟶ initiation of criminal proceedings. scheming
 Usage note: in other contexts (notably theater): "staging", "stage design" grounds, reason, motive for a judgment or judicial decision mutilation. A type of corporal punishment under the Ancien régime. See .

 N  
 absence of guilt. absence of criminal responsibility due to mental defect or duress. Decision of an investigating court to put an end to criminal proceedings when it considers that an offense has not been established or that there is insufficient evidence against the perpetrator or accomplice of the offense; or when the accused is considered, for example, not to be criminally responsible at the time of the offense. See also: ,) or when there is a justifying fact (e.g. ).

 O  
 court-ordered treatment. See . A person holding an office conferred by the State and appointed by the decision of a minister. Ministerial officers include: solicitors at the courts of appeal, the bailiffs, the notaries, and the lawyers at the Council of State and at the Court of Cassation. Some of them are also public officers. Officers with the power to authenticate legal or judicial acts and to implement court decisions. Examples: notaries, bailiffs.

 . See . See also: . Prosecutorial discretion. The right of the  Public Prosecutor's Office, when a criminal offense is reported to it, to initiate or not to initiate public proceedings according to the particularities of the case, according to article 40-1 of the Code of Criminal Procedure. Related terms: , nolle prosequi. See also: . A civil or criminal remedy that allows people who have been judged by default to be tried again. (In civil law, the ordonnance is only provisional.) Under the ancien régime, a regulation issued by the king. The least important of three types of law. In other contexts: many other meanings, including: a  pharmaceutical prescription and many others. A set of rules governing life in society and enacted in the general interest. A rule is characterized as being about "public order" when it is mandatory and imposed for imperative reasons of protection, safety or morality. Persons may not transgress these rules in any way and may not exercise any rights which would otherwise be available to them if they violate them.
 the social condition characterized by tranquility, public health, and safety. Syn.: . See the Preamble to the 1848 Constitution, point IV (in French, in English). See also: .
; decision-making body 
 hearsay

 P 

A civil plaintiff in a criminal proceeding.
 This term also designates the procedure (the complaint by a civil party) allowing the victim to go either to the investigating judge or the competent court to obtain compensation. 
  (lit. 'afflictive punishment') – a penal sanction pronounced to plunge the convicted person into pain and sadness. While the penal code of 1810 still used this term, the 1993 Code ignores it.
  (lit. 'punishment of dishonor') - A punishment is considered to be  (defamatory; degrading; dishonorable) when it is detrimental to the honor of the convicted person, and more precisely to the reputation he enjoys in society. Article 6 of the penal code of 1810 described banishment and degradation as simply dishonorable sentences. The current code does not use this term. An investigative measure that consists of searching for evidence of an offense, at a person's home or in any location where it may be found. See . A legal person. An organization recognized as having a legal existence and that as such, holds rights and obligations (Example: a company, an association); Contrast: . A natural person. A  (legal person) having a juridical status of  conferred upon it by law. such as a municipality or a government department for example exhibit; evidence Pillory. A type of public punishment under the Ancien régime. See . (PSE) An electronic bracelet is a method of enforcing a prison sentence outside of a prison establishment. The bracelet, most often attached to the ankle, is an electronic transmitter that makes it possible to detect, at a distance, the presence or absence of the convicted person in a place and for a period previously determined in the context of the sentence. (PSEM) 
The  (electronic bracelet), is generally worn on the ankle, and is supplemented by a GPS device. The device is managed by the prison administration and makes it possible to verify the person's location and that they respect the obligations and prohibitions set by judicial authorities. See . any act or word that calls into question the honor of a person, to the point that he can not let the outrage go unpunished. In the past it was legitimate cause for a duel, but since dueling was prohibited, the sole arbiter for attacks on the moral integrity of a person is the courts.
 Usage note (in other contexts): 
  – to make a point of something.
  – emphasize; be committed to, dedicated to, devoted to; put special care into; make a point of.  police involved with prevention of crime (not part of criminal law). Contrast: . Judicial police are police involved with criminal investigation. Literally: to bring a complaint. Compare: . prosecution, in the sense of 
  ⟶ grounds for appeal
   ⟶ appeal; lodge an appeal; appeal against injury; Damage to a person's property, body, feelings or honor. There are four types:
  (of enjoyment) – : the damage that results, generally following a bodily injury, from the deprivation of the enjoyment of certain acts of everyday life, such as the exercise of an artistic activity, a leisure activity, or a sport.
  (bodily injury) – injury to the health or physical or mental integrity of a person. Example: wound, infirmity.
  (material damage) – Damage to property. Example: , damage, physical deterioration, loss of income.
  (emotional or psychological harm) – damage of a psychological nature. Example: suffering linked to the loss of a loved one.
Terms are longer for offenses against minors. Presumption of innocence. See also article 9 of the Declaration of the Rights of Man and of the Citizen, and article 1 of the penal code. See also . The principle of legality is one of the most fundamental principles of French criminal law and holds that no one may be convicted of a criminal offense without a prior published legal text describing the offense and the penalty. . See . The adversarial system (or, "adversarial law"), is a system of justice whose rules of procedure are based on the parties to the litigation. Thus, the lawyers for the plaintiff and defendant are responsible for presenting their version of the facts and convincing the judge or jury of the merits of their case. Inquisitorial system. A legal system in which the court is actively involved in investigating the facts of the case. Contrast . Examples: notes about an investigation, or a seizure)
 In other contexts: minutes; record; transcript.

   "aggravating", when used with some crimes.
 Usage notes: 
 In judgments by magistrates, the expression  is used when a legislator requires a supermajority of 2/3. 
 In non-legal context,  means "characterized as" (or "by"), or "described as"; as a simple adj. or past participle,  means "qualified", as in English.  anyone who; everyone who; whoever. Used legally to emphasize that it applies to everyone, without exception.

 R  a warning; a reminder of the law as an alternative to prosecution. The aim is to make the offender aware that they committed an illegal act, in order to prevent them from reoffending. A previously convicted individual who commits, under certain conditions and within a certain period of time, a new offense that may result in a heavier sentence than usual. 
 imprisonment imprisonment life imprisonment See . appeal. See also: , . 
 a regulation issued by the executive power See also: , .  There are two types:
 décret  - issued by the Prime Minister or the President)
 arrêté -  issued by the executive branch members other than the President or Prime Minister
 In other contexts: many other meanings, including "payment". A measure which erases a criminal conviction. It ends all forfeitures or limitations on the exercise of individual rights resulting from the conviction. It is acquired either after the expiration of the time limits prescribed by law, or by a decision of the investigating chamber in response to a request made by the convicted person. Also: .  handing over Postponement of a hearing to another date. The term  is another term for criminal law. tribunaux répressifs, are courts that deal with stopping (repressing) criminal activity after it happens. Contrast with administrative law, tasked with preventing criminal activity, rather than repressing it. to incriminate Written or oral conclusions taken in the interest of society that the public prosecutor presents before the criminal court to justify the guilt of a defendant and the sentence requested. 

 Usage note: Also used in forms of the verb , such as : . ⟶ The prosecutor has requested a suspended sentence of 1 year in prison. a formal submission (by the prosecution) application for judicial investigation One of the ways that the  can initiate criminal proceedings, in particular, via .
See also . decision to bring charges Criminal responsibility the scope or extent of a court's jurisdiction in terms of the geography and nature of the disputes assigned to it by law. For example, the correctional court cannot try an offense committed outside its  and for which the perpetrator does not live in that region.
 A court decision is said to be "" (final) if it can no longer be appealed. detention of dangerous offenders beyond the term of their sentence. the characteristic of a legal norm that regulates situations that arose before its adoption. An appeal against a conviction that allows a case to be retried in light of new facts or elements unknown at the time of the initial trial that could rule out the guilt of the convicted person.  See . fraud

 S  Submission of a request to a jurisdiction, requiring a response in the form of a decision. In non-legal context,  simply means:  "seize", "grab", "grasp".
 In legal context, there are many meanings, such as "confiscate", which are directly related to the non-legal sense; these are straightforward, and not explained here.
 The general form for this sense is:  + saisit +   +  (de, d'un, d'une) +  , with these four parts:
 subject: someone (a person, plaintiff, etc.) or institution who is the requester, i.e.,  the one who applies to or requests something (optional)
 form of verb  (required)
 object: someone or something in authority who may grant or act on a request: the judge, the court, the tribunal, etc. (required)
 the request, usually as a prep. phrase with de, pour, etc. (optional)

 Annotated examples:
 
 The mother[subj] applies to[saisit] the court[obj] for custody of all four children[request]. 

 
 The prosecutor[subj] instructed[saisit] the examining magistrate of the first chamber[obj] to investigate the case[request-1] and issue arrest warrants for the accused[request-2].

How to translate  depends a lot on context, and may use terms like "apply to", "take to", "go to", "bring before", "approach", "request", "refer to", "submit", or other expressions, and the word order in English may be different:
  ⟶ refer the matter to the judge for family affairs
  ⟶ the constitutional right to go to court
  ⟶ it was possible to bring the case before the judge
  ⟶ bring a cease and desist order before the Court
  ⟶ Anyone who objects to the order has recourse to the court. 
  ⟶ The Ombudsman can also submit cases to the Constitutional Court.
  ⟶ Workers who are victims of discrimination may apply to the Labor Tribunal.

In the passive, the pattern uses the participial form  and inverted word order, often with optional parts missing:  
  ⟶ (lit.) "the judge applied to/requested [by someone] regarding the case", or in more usual English word order:  "the judge handling the case", or, "the judge on the case"
  ⟶ the judge for the motion

Sometimes the best translation involves leaving the word out entirely. Also, the order of the elements is not always the same, and the request often comes before the authority-object.

   ⟶ ANF[subj] had filed[saisir] a complaint[request] with the Marseilles investigating magistrate[obj] bringing civil action against alleged acts committed by the supplier...

The request can be omitted, so just the subject, verb , and object are present. In the abstract, the subject may be omitted:
   ⟶  Going to[saisir] court[obj]; seeking[saisir] justice[obj].

 Usage notes:
 The form  is often seen, and translation depends on context. The word  means "facts", and depending on whether "" is a syntactic constituent in the sentence, the word "facts" may or may not appear in English translation. A literal translation of the passive construction might be: "[an authority] who had been applied to [by someone, unstated] with the facts [of an unstated (legal) request]"; but in free translation, this might come out simply as "[the judge] on the case", and may be expressed very differently in specific contexts.  Some examples:
  
 ⟶ The case would then  within the provincial jurisdiction  a crown attorney, who takes the facts to court.
 
 ⟶ In other words, [he] must  and must consider new or contested  in order to confirm an actual ruling to the client. Note: not a syntactic constituent; must use the word facts here.
  
 ⟶ if the same  today, with that Code available to it as an adjudicative tool, it might arrive at a different conclusion.  Not a constituent.
 
A "reparation sanction": is an alternative sentence which obliges the perpetrator to repair the damage caused to the victim through financial compensation or reparation in kind. 1. an order that evidence be placed under seal. Also refers to the practice of a wax seal to an item.  
 Usage notes: in legal terminology, almost always plural. In the singular, it refers to the sealing material itself, such as wax.
  ⟶ placed under seal
 2.
 3. Other meanings apply in civil law, having to do with sealing off buildings, rooms, etc. Breaking such a seal duly placed by civil authorities is punishable under criminal law.  knowingly day parole; day release; semi-liberty. A criminal sanctions program that authorizes a convicted person to carry out activity outside the prison, which may be professional activity, schooling, or medical treatment. At the end of each day, the convict returns to the detention center.
 sursis avec mise à l'épreuve with certain conditions such as geographic restrictions or interaction restrictions supervision

 T , 
 law of retaliation Originally, and dating to the Code of Hammurabi, it restricts a victim from taking vengeance in a disproportionate manner; "an eye for an eye". witness represented witness
Because of their status as a possible suspect, the law requires them to be heard only in presence of their lawyer.
His lawyer has access to the case file. When heard by the investigating judge, the assisted witness may ask to be confronted with the person or persons implicating him. If the judge considers that the witness should be placed under judicial supervision or in pre-trial detention, or be referred to the criminal court or the assize court to be tried, he or she will then proceed with the examination. attempt
 A  or  interrupted in act by an event beyond the control of its perpetrator. The attempt is punishable by the same penalties as if the offense had been fully carried out.
 Usage notes:
 tentative achevée ⟶ failed attempt
 tentative stérile ⟶ failed attempt torture. A type of punishment used in the Ancien régime. See also: , . (TIG)
 community service; carrying out unpaid work, within a specified time, for the benefit of a public body or an approved association, as part of a sentence by an adult or juvenile court. It judges 5th class offenses. For example: these two orders claim to be simultaneously competent or incompetent for the same case. criminal court to kill See .

 UV  See .
A person who personally and directly suffers a physical, moral or material  (injury). rape; In the classic sense, rape consists in the fact of a man having a carnal relationship with a non-consenting woman, or in circumstances where she cannot manifest her  (will). breach; violation. In the former sense, compare .
 Note: has an entirely different meaning in administrative law. theft intentionally will;  In criminal law,  (will) is a firm and definite determination in a person's mind to do something that will have an effect in the outside world. The term  indicates the purpose for which the will is directed.

 WXYZ  X'' represents an unknown person, a 'John Doe', used in a criminal complaint when the name of the person is not known.
 Usage note:   ⟶ a complaint against 'X'. Analogous to a "John Doe defendant", or a John Doe lawsuit.

See also 

 Administrative police (France)
 Glossary of the French Revolution
 Glossary of law
 Judiciary of France#Glossary
 Legal history of France

References 
Notes

Citations

Works cited

Further reading

External links 

 Lexique Des Termes Juridiques Fr-En IBJ Criminal Defense Wiki  (Geneva)
 Glossary of English/French/Spanish Legal Terms 41 pages; Defense Wiki
 List of law dictionaries
 IATE European Union Terminology - search engine and translator
 EU Vocabularies - search engine and translator
 e-Justice 
 Dictionnaire du droit privé - browse or search; results link long, detailed articles on each term

Canadian sources:

 Lexique français-anglais  jurisource.ca;  124 pages
 Lexique anglais-français jurisource.ca;  146 pages
 Justice of Canada - a few dozen links to dictionaries and glossaries
 Dictionnaires de droit prive McGill - browse/search, with definition, antonym, and translation
 Lexiques et dictionnaires - dozens of links

French criminal law
Glossaries of law